The Journal of Computational and Graphical Statistics is a quarterly peer-reviewed scientific journal published by Taylor & Francis on behalf of the American Statistical Association. Established in 1992, the journal covers the use of computational and graphical methods in statistics and data analysis, including numerical methods, graphical displays and methods, and perception. It is published jointly with the Institute of Mathematical Statistics and the Interface Foundation of North America. According to the Journal Citation Reports, the journal has a 2021 impact factor of 1.884.

See also 
List of statistics journals

References

External links 
 

American Statistical Association academic journals
Computational statistics journals
Publications established in 1992
Quarterly journals
English-language journals
Taylor & Francis academic journals
Institute of Mathematical Statistics academic journals